Luis Barrionuevo (born 16 February 1949) is an Argentine athlete. He competed in the men's high jump at the 1972 Summer Olympics.

References

1949 births
Living people
Athletes (track and field) at the 1971 Pan American Games
Athletes (track and field) at the 1972 Summer Olympics
Athletes (track and field) at the 1975 Pan American Games
Argentine male high jumpers
Olympic athletes of Argentina
Place of birth missing (living people)
Pan American Games competitors for Argentina